William Swan Stodart (31 March 1904 – 22 January 1990) was a New Zealand rowing coxswain. At the 1938 British Empire Games he won the bronze medal as part of the men's eight.

References

1904 births
1990 deaths
New Zealand male rowers
Rowers at the 1938 British Empire Games
Commonwealth Games bronze medallists for New Zealand
Commonwealth Games medallists in rowing
Coxswains (rowing)
Medallists at the 1938 British Empire Games